Easwaran or Eswaran is an Indian surname and may refer to:
 Abhimanyu Easwaran (born 1995), Indian first-class cricketer
 Eknath Easwaran (1910–1999), Indian-born spiritual teacher and author
 K. R. K. Easwaran (born 1939), Indian molecular biophysicist 
 Kenny Easwaran, American Indian philosopher 
 Mannargudi Easwaran (born 1947), contemporary mridangam player and Carnatic musician
 E. R. Eswaran (born 1961), Indian politician and entrepreneur
 Kapali Eswaran, one of the founding members of the IBM System R Project
 R. Eswaran, Indian politician
 Vijay Eswaran (born 1960), Malaysian businessman